Cornwall Collegiate and Vocational School (CCVS) is a high school located in Cornwall, Ontario.  It was built in 1806 and is one of the oldest schools in Canada.  The school's bicentennial in 2006 attracted over 1500 former students back to the school.

History
Cornwall Collegiate and Vocational School was founded in 1806 by John Strachan as the Cornwall Grammar School.  Strachan would later go on to help found the University of Toronto.  Over the years, the school has been through several structural changes, such as when the 1944 Cornwall–Massena earthquake destroyed the middle of the building which then had to be demolished and reconstructed.  In the mid-1970s, the centre core again underwent major renovations.  Additional changes were made during the summer months of 2011 and 2012 to help accommodate the students from General Vanier Intermediate School for the 2011–12 school year, and later to assist with the transition of the Kinsmen-Vincent Massey school for the 2012–13 school year.

In a 2002 controversial decision, the school's grade 9 and 10 students were moved to St. Lawrence and General Vanier, while grade 11 and 12 students from those schools were subsequently moved to CCVS in an effort to cut costs.  This was changed back in 2010, which resulted in CCVS becoming a 7–12 school following the General Vanier Intermediate School closure at the conclusion of the 2010–11 school year.

Today, CCVS is an ethnically diverse school which reflects the changing demographics in the city of Cornwall.  Due to its long history, CCVS offers many scholarship, bursary and award opportunities that total more than $150,000 for its graduating students. Notable among these is the Arthur F. Battista memorial bursary.  It is awarded to 30 graduates each year, 15 to college bound students and 15 to university bound students. The bursary awards the university bound students with $4,000 over two years, and $3,500 to college bound students.

Currently, CCVS offers Special High Skills Majors in Arts and Culture and Communication and Technology.  Students can earn a red seal on their diploma if they successfully complete a certain number of credits in these areas of study.

See also
List of high schools in Ontario

References

High schools in Cornwall, Ontario
Educational institutions established in 1806